The King of Fighters: A New Beginning is a Japanese shōnen manga authored by Kyōtarō Azuma. The series has been serialized in Kodansha's Magazine Pocket since January 2018, ending in August 2020. Seven Seas Entertainment licensed the manga for a North American release with the first volume released in March 2020. The manga is an adaptation of SNK's 2016 fighting game The King of Fighters XIV and follows multiple characters who get involved in a new worldwide tournament led by a man known as Antonov.

Plot
Years after the last fighting tournament known as "The King of Fighters", a man Antonov leads his own competition. This attracts returning fighters and most notably newcomers. The elder martial artist Tung Fu Rue wants to use this fight to test his student Shun'ei and Meitenkun's powers. Elsewhere almost nearby the stadium, an Ainu priestess from the past, Nakoruru appears in the present and sense the eerie anomaly located at the stadium. In the first team battle, Japan Team composed of Kyo Kusanagi, Benimaru Nikaido and Goro Daimon faces the Yagami Team composed of Iori Yagami, Vice and Mature. While Benimaru and Daimon win their respective fights, Kyo's and Iori's end on a double knock out following Iori's being turned into a berserker by his allies from a god named Orochi, due to the anomaly Nakoruru discovered. Although Japan Team lost one point due to Benimaru's interference, they still won the match.

For the next match, Shun'ei tries to show his powers in combat but is beat by Ryo Sakazaki, due to losing control of his powers. However, Tung and Meitenkun defeat Ryo's teammates Robert Garcia and Yuri Sakazaki, respectively, due to two latter lack of hard training. In the next match a trio of mercenaries, The Ikari Team, face the team of Mexican wrestlers. Formerly a terrorist working for NESTS, Angel loses her match against Leona Heidern when her mind is controlled by the power of Orochi like Iori. As Ralf Jones and Clark Still also win their battles against Team Mexico, but failed a mission on letting one of the Mexico Team members win, the groups asks for Kyo's, Athena Asamiya's and Sie Kensou's aid to investigate Angel's recent change.

The tournament progresses with the K' Team composed of the former NESTS experiments, K', Kula Diamond and Maxima against the Team South America, composed of Nelson, Zarina, Bandeiras Hattori. NESTS's influence in Nelson's arm causes Kula to go interrupt K' fight and try to kill him. Meanwhile, Kyo, Athena and Sie find an army of composed Kyo's replicas created by the former NESTS leader, Igniz, who aims to control one of them as his new body, including NESTS' former subject Sylvie Paula Paula, one of Antonov's Official Invitation Team member. Enraged, Kyo murders Igniz and destroys all of his replicas. This causes the Igniz behind the South America Team to escape but is killed by K', freeing Kula and Sylvie at a same time. Kim Kaphwan, who was forcibly teaming up with his master Gang-Il, and the latter's lover Luong, switch places with a criminal Xanadu, to take both of his former team members Chang Koehan and Choi Bounge back to rehabilitation elsewhere.

With NESTS defeated, the tournament is interrupted by a supernatural creature who only yells the word Verse. A criminal fighter named Geese Howard fights Verse and absorbs its power, transforming himself into Nightmare Geese, and faces both the Fatal Fury Team composed of Terry Bogard, Andy Bogard and Joe Higashi, and Team China. Nightmare Geese fights Shun'ei, while the wraiths of previously deceased villains (Hakkeshu members Goenitz and Team Orochi/New Faces, and NESTS members Krizalid and Original Zero) created by Verse's power face Kyo and other teams (except Kim, Chang and Choi) from the tournament, as well as eight spirit warriors of Samurai Shodown summoned by Nakoruru (Haohmaru, Genjuro Kibagami, Hanzo Hattori, Charlotte Christine de Colde, Ukyo Tachibana, Galford D. Weller and Poppy, and her younger sister Rimururu). Once Shun'ei defeats Geese and depower him from his Verse-powered Nightmare form, the wraiths disappear, just as Geese and his team members Billy Kane and the butler Hein escapes. However, the Ikari Team learn after Verse was defeated, its power produced the revival of more people, including the wraiths they fought and the missing Ash Crimson.

Publication
The series was first announced in November 2017 by Kodansha to be published in online Magazine Pocket for free. Kyōtarō Azuma's work is being reviewed by Akihiko Ureshino, writer of most The King of Fighters works. The King of Fighters XIV producer Yasuyuki Oda noted that while the story might fit within the franchise's canon, it could greatly influence their latter works as they aim A New Beginning to stay true to the game's narrative. Although the original The King of Fighters XIV game offered extra characters in the form of downloadable content, Azuma refrained from using them.

The first tankōbon volume was released on August 9, 2018. Sales of the series have been positive with Azuma noting that the third Japanese volume run out of print and due to fan demand, Kodansha re-print more copies of it. However, Azuma stated the amount of releases for every volume was relatively low. By the time the third volume was released, Oda stated the series is an entertaining fighting series, hoping it attracts more readers. In January 2019, the series took a one-month hiatus due to issues with the editorial. However, Azuma said that there were no major issues so the manga will continue serialization without any problems. According to Azuma the series is meant to conclude in September 2020 with the story having reached its climax by May of the same year. The manga ended serialization on August 23, 2020 with Azuma thanking the fan response.

In July 2019, Seven Seas Entertainment announced they licensed the manga for a North American release with the first volume aiming to be released in early 2020. The first volume was released on March 10, 2020. The translation is being handled by Daniel Komen and J.P. Sullivan.

Chapter list

Reception
Anime UK News scored the first volume a 8 out of 10, praising the adaptation to the game faithful as well as the illustrations of fight scenes, most notably Kyo Kusanagi's against Iori Yagami, whom the reviewer found enjoyable based on their popularity. The OSAG scored it three starts out of five, criticizing the lack of narrative provided by the manga's introduction to the cast but praised the handling of battles of the tournament. Anime News Network mixed thoughts about the handling of the artwork and panned the story for making its entire first volume only accessible to long time fans due to its heavy lack of introduction to the characters.

References

External links
Official Japanese website

Japanese webcomics
The King of Fighters
Kodansha manga
Manga based on video games
Seven Seas Entertainment titles
Shōnen manga
Webcomics in print